Garcia  is an American actor, best known for their starring role in the 2019 Netflix miniseries Tales of the City in which Garcia played a recently transitioned trans man exploring a newfound attraction to men. Garcia also served as a production consultant on the series. Garcia is non-binary, and uses they/them pronouns.

Early life 
Garcia grew up in Chicago and, after dropping out of community college, began performing with the local theater company Free Street. Garcia later went back to school, moving to New York City to study at New York University.

Work 
Garcia's first credited role was in Netflix's 2019 series Tales of the City, a sequel to the earlier miniseries. They played the role of Jake Rodriguez, a trans man struggling with his new identity, his relationship, and his feelings of attraction towards men. Garcia's performance was well-received, described as "affecting" and with commentators noting with approval that they were one of a number of queer actors cast in queer roles. Garcia also has a recurring role on Party of Five (2020 TV series) where they play Matthew, an undocumented trans man.

Personal life 
Garcia is transgender non-binary.

References

External links 

21st-century American actors
American television actors
Living people
Actors from Chicago
American transgender actors
American non-binary actors
LGBT people from Illinois
Year of birth missing (living people)
Place of birth missing (living people)
Transgender non-binary people